Wu Yue may refer to the following:

Wuyue, a 10th-century kingdom during the Five Dynasties and Ten Kingdoms period
Sacred Mountains of China, also known as "Wu Yue" ("Five Mountains") in Chinese

People
Wu Yue (actor) (born 1976), Chinese male actor
Wu Yue (actress) (born 1976), Chinese actress
Wu Yue (swimmer) (born 1997), Chinese swimmer
Wu Yue (table tennis) (born 1990), American table tennis player

Other uses
Wu (state) and Yue (state), two ancient states during the Spring and Autumn and Warring States periods
Wu (region), also known as Wuyue, a Chinese region in Jiangsu and Zhejiang provinces
Speakers of Wu Chinese, also known as Wuyue people, a subgroup of Han Chinese in the Wu region